Robert Simon Johnson (born 22 February 1962 in Bedford, England) is a former English footballer, most noted as a player for Luton Town.

Playing career

Johnson signed for local club Luton Town as a 17-year-old in August 1979, but due to two serious knee injuries he didn't make his debut until late on in the 1982–83 season. The start of 1983–84 saw him loaned out to Lincoln City, where he made four appearances before returning to Kenilworth Road. Neither this year nor the next saw him play at all however, and he didn't become a first team player until 1985–86, when he made 15 appearances. He was now a first team regular, and he even appeared in the 1988 League Cup Final, helping Luton to a 3–2 victory over Arsenal. A year later, he moved to Leicester City, where he made 25 appearances in two years before a move to Barnet. He only played twice for Barnet before a move into non-League with Hitchin Town.

Post-playing career

Johnson is currently a physiotherapist, and has his own practice in Matlock.

References

1962 births
Living people
Sportspeople from Bedford
English footballers
English Football League players
Luton Town F.C. players
Lincoln City F.C. players
Leicester City F.C. players
Barnet F.C. players
British physiotherapists
Hitchin Town F.C. players
Association football defenders
Footballers from Bedfordshire